The Okinawa Japan Temple is a temple of the Church of Jesus Christ of Latter-day Saints under construction in Okinawa, Japan.

History
The intent to construct the temple was announced by church president Russell M. Nelson on April 7, 2019. The Okinawa Japan Temple was announced concurrently with 7 other temples.

A groundbreaking, to signify the beginning of construction, was held on December 5, 2020, with Takashi Wada, president of the church's Asia North Area, presiding. The temple will be a two-story building of approximately 10,000 square feet building. A temple patron arrival center will be added to an adjacent existing meetinghouse.

The Okinawa Japan Temple is the first temple to be built in Okinawa and will be the church's fourth temple built in Japan, following the Tokyo (1980), Fukuoka (2000), and Sapporo (2016) temples.

According to the church, there are more than 130,000 Latter-day Saints spread throughout more than 260 congregations in Japan.  The church has been in Japan since 1901. The Okinawa Japan Temple will serve native Japanese church members living on the islands, along with military personnel and their families assigned to Japan from other countries, such as the United States.

See also

 The Church of Jesus Christ of Latter-day Saints in Japan
 Comparison of temples of The Church of Jesus Christ of Latter-day Saints
 List of temples of The Church of Jesus Christ of Latter-day Saints
 List of temples of The Church of Jesus Christ of Latter-day Saints by geographic region
 Religion in Japan
 Temple architecture (Latter-day Saints)

References

External links
Alabang Philippines Temple Groundbreaking announcement
Alabang Philippines Temple at ChurchofJesusChristTemples.org

Proposed buildings and structures in Japan
Religious buildings and structures in Okinawa Prefecture
Proposed religious buildings and structures of the Church of Jesus Christ of Latter-day Saints
Temples (LDS Church) in Japan
The Church of Jesus Christ of Latter-day Saints in Japan
21st-century Latter Day Saint temples